Matthys Cock or Matthijs Wellens de Cock (c. 1505 – 1548) was a Flemish landscape painter and draughtsman.  He is known for his landscapes, marine art and architectural drawings.

Life
He was born into a family of painters: his father was the Leiden-born painter Jan Wellens de Cock (1490–1527), and his younger brother Hieronymus Cock (1510–1570) became a famous engraver.  Cock may have visited Italy.  He took on pupils Willem van Santvoort, Jacob Grimmer and Jan Keynooghe.

A portrait of Cock was included in the 1572 collection of portraits of early Netherlandish painters entitled Pictorum aliquot celebrium Germaniae inferioris effigies with a poem about his landscapes by Dominicus Lampsonius.

Work
Only one signed painting of a landscape by his hand is known.  He is mainly known for his drawings of landscapes.  His younger brother Hieronymus engraved 13 of his landscapes and published them in 1558 under the title 'Landscapes with Biblical and Mythological Scenes' (the longer Dutch title is: ‘'Various sorts of landscapes with fine histories composed therein, from the Old and New Testaments, and several merry Poems, very convenient for painters and other connoisseurs of the arts). The early biographer Karel van Mander stated in the Schilder-boeck of 1604 that Cock was the first to bring the southern manner of landscape painting to the North. His landscapes show that he was aware of the work of Titian and the Venetian draughtsman Domenico Campagnola.   He was the first to specialise in the depiction of villages and country retreats.

Cock has been suggested as one of the likely draughtsmen of the Errara sketchbook in the collection of the Royal Museums of Fine Arts of Belgium but this attribution is not generally accepted.

References

External links

1505 births
1548 deaths
Flemish Renaissance painters
Flemish landscape painters